The 2017 Claro Open Medellín was a professional tennis tournament played on outdoor clay courts. It was the 14th edition of the tournament, which was part of the 2017 ATP Challenger Tour. It took place in Medellín, Colombia, between 11 and 16 July 2017.

Singles main draw entrants

Seeds

 1 Rankings as of 3 July 2017.

Other entrants
The following players received wild cards into the singles main draw:
  Gabriel Carvajal
  Charles Force
  Sergio Luis Hernández Ramírez
  Carlos Salamanca

The following players received entry from the qualifying draw:
  Christopher Díaz Figueroa
  Franco Emanuel Egea
  José Olivares
  David Souto

The following players received entry into the singles main draw as lucky losers:
  Alejandro Mendoza
  Michel Vernier

Champions

Singles

 Nicolás Jarry def.  João Souza 6–1, 3–6, 7–6(7–0).

Doubles

 Darian King /  Miguel Ángel Reyes-Varela def.  Nicolás Jarry /  Roberto Quiroz 6–4, 6–4.

External links 
 Official website

2017
2017
2017 in Colombian tennis
Claro Open Medellín